The women's discus throw at the 2013 World Championships in Athletics was held at the Luzhniki Stadium on 10–11 August.

There were 6 automatic qualifiers for the final.  It took 60.14 to get in.  In the final Sandra Perković dominated from her first throw.  Any of her three fair throws would have won the competition.  Yarelys Barrios was a solid second place from her first throw, but she never improved.  Meanwhile, Mélina Robert-Michon did improve, her third round throw putting her into second and her final throw more than a meter further to improve her own French national record set more than 11 years (and one daughter) earlier.  The record throw was all the more remarkable due to the rainy conditions that hampered the rest of the field, hers was the only improvement after the rains started toward the end of the fourth round.

Records
Prior to the competition, the records were as follows:

Qualification standards

Schedule

Results

Qualification
Qualification: 63.00 m (Q) and at least 12 best (q) advanced to the final.

Final
The final was held on 11 August.

References

External links
Discus throw results at IAAF website

Discus throw
Discus throw at the World Athletics Championships
2013 in women's athletics